Zhong Hongyan (born November 29, 1978 in Tongxiang, Jiaxing, Zhejiang) is a Chinese sprint canoer who has competed since 1997. She won two medals at the ICF Canoe Sprint World Championships with a silver (K-4 1000 m: 2002) and a bronze (K-1 500 m: 2006).

Zhong also competed in two Summer Olympics, earning her best finish of fourth in the K-2 500 m event at Athens in 2004.

References

2008 Chinese Olympic Team profile

Sports-reference.com profile

1978 births
Living people
Canoeists at the 2004 Summer Olympics
Canoeists at the 2008 Summer Olympics
Olympic canoeists of China
Sportspeople from Jiaxing
Asian Games medalists in canoeing
ICF Canoe Sprint World Championships medalists in kayak
Canoeists at the 2002 Asian Games
Canoeists at the 2006 Asian Games
Canoeists at the 1998 Asian Games
Chinese female canoeists
Asian Games gold medalists for China
Asian Games silver medalists for China
Medalists at the 1998 Asian Games
Medalists at the 2002 Asian Games
Medalists at the 2006 Asian Games